The discography of American country music artist Holly Dunn contains nine studio albums, one compilation album, 26 singles and 12 music videos. Originally a songwriter for MTM Records, she signed with the same label as a recording artist in 1985. Her debut single was 1985's "Praying for Keeps", which became a minor hit. In the same year she issued her self-titled debut album, her single "Daddy's Hands" became a major hit. The single peaked at number 7 on the Billboard Hot Country Songs chart. In 1987, her second album Cornerstone was issued. The record spawned three top ten country hits: "Love Someone Like Me", "Only When I Love" and "Strangers Again". 

Her third studio album, Across the Rio Grande (1988), reached number 26 on the Billboard Top Country Albums chart. Among its singles was "That's What Your Love Does to Me", which became a top ten hit. In 1989, Dunn switched to Warner Bros. Records where she issued The Blue Rose of Texas. The album spawned the number one hit "Are You Ever Gonna Love Me". In 1990, she released her fifth studio record entitled Heart Full of Love. It spawned her second number one single, "You Really Had Me Going".

In 1991, her first compilation album was released entitled Milestones: Greatest Hits, which peaked at number 25 on the Billboard country albums chart. The album spawned two minor hits, including "Maybe I Mean Yes". Her final album with Warner Bros. appeared in 1992, Getting It Dunn, which did not reach any Billboard chart positions. In 1995, she returned with her seventh studio release, Life and Love and All the Stages. Its lead single, "I Am Who I Am", was her final chart appearance, reaching number 56 on the country singles chart. Her final studio album issued was a gospel record entitled Full Circle (2003).

Albums

Studio albums

Compilation albums

Singles

As lead artist

As a featured artist

Videography

Video albums

Music videos

Notes

References

External links
 Holly Dunn discography at Discogs

Discographies of American artists
Country music discographies